The J.P. Morgan Reserve Card, formerly branded and colloquially known as the Palladium Card, is a credit card issued by J.P. Morgan on the Visa network. It is reserved for the wealthiest clients of the firm's global private bank. The card is minted out of a brass alloy, laser-engraved, and plated with metal palladium and 23-karat gold. Eligibility for the card is not fully known as it is invitation-only and at the discretion of J.P. Morgan. The card does not report to credit bureaus or maintain a pre-set credit limit. It is considered a status symbol among the affluent.

History 
The card was launched in September 2009, following the 2008 financial crisis, for J.P. Morgan's ultra-high-net-worth clients. Its original name, the Palladium Card, reflected the card's composition: minted out of a brass alloy, laser-engraved, and plated with metal palladium. The card was re-branded as the J.P. Morgan Reserve Card in September 2016. Bloomberg described the Palladium Card as the "card for the 1% of the 1%". Clients of J.P. Morgan who are invited to carry the card must have a reported minimum of US$10 million in assets under management (AUM) with the private bank. The firm declined to confirm this figure as part of their eligibility requirements. There are only 5,000 Palladium card holders worldwide.

Physical specifications
The Reserve Card was one of the first U.S. credit cards to adopt EMV smart chip technology. With its 23-karat gold construction and palladium plating, the card weighs 1 ounce or 28.35 grams, five times the weight of a conventional plastic credit card and twice the weight of the titanium constructed American Express Centurion Card. The value of the materials used to construct the card is $1,000.

Features

See also 

 American Express, Centurion Card, and Platinum Card
 MasterCard and Visa
 Credit score in the United States
 Banking in the United States

Notes

External links

References

Credit cards
JPMorgan Chase
Products introduced in 2009